Mark Steenhuis (born December 3, 1980) is a Canadian former professional lacrosse player who last played for the Buffalo Bandits in the National Lacrosse League (NLL) and formerly with the Hamilton Nationals of Major League Lacrosse (MLL).

Introduction to lacrosse
Born in St. Catharines, Ontario, Steenhuis graduated from Governor Simcoe Secondary School in 1998. He did not start playing lacrosse until he was 17-years-old, when he was introduced to the game by friend and future Buffalo Bandits teammate, Billy Dee Smith.

NLL career
Steenhuis made his NLL debut in 2002 with the Columbus Landsharks. After the 2002 season, he was traded to the Buffalo Bandits for goalie Ken Montour. Once in Buffalo, Steenhuis quickly became a fan favorite, due in part to his energetic style of play, goal-scoring ability, and athleticism, but also for his afro hair and bright orange shoes.

Steenhuis was named MVP of the 2004, 2007 and 2009 National Lacrosse League All-Star Games, becoming the first player in NLL history to be named MVP of multiple All-Star Games. He scored six times in 2004 and 2007 and seven times in 2009. In 2008, Steenhuis was named the NLL Transition Player of the Year. and the NLL Championship Game MVP.

On February 14, 2009, he set the league single-game records for assists (13) and points (17).

Canadian Box career

Junior
After having a surprisingly successful rookie season with the Spartan Warriors in 1999, Steenhuis played two successful years of Jr.A lacrosse with the St. Catharines Athletics, and helped lead the team to a Minto Cup national championship in 2001.

Senior
Steenhuis began his senior career with the St. Catharines Athletics of Major Series Lacrosse. During his first season, he recorded 20 goals and 50 points, and shared the "Gene Dopp Memorial Trophy" for Rookie of the Year with Mike Miron. The next year, Steenhuis had 54 points in 14 games, and was awarded the "Jim Murphy Trophy" for league Most Valuable Player. In 2004, Steenhuis would have a career high of 91 points in just 17 games, averaging 5.3 points per game. Steenhuis played for the St. Regis Indians in 2008 and 2009 before the team folded. In 2010, Steenhuis was selected 1st overall by the Peterborough Lakers in the St. Regis dispersal draft.

Statistics

NLL
Reference:

OLA

Awards

References

1980 births
Living people
Buffalo Bandits players
Canadian lacrosse players
Lacrosse people from Ontario
Lacrosse transitions
National Lacrosse League All-Stars
National Lacrosse League major award winners
Sportspeople from St. Catharines
Hamilton Nationals players
Columbus Landsharks players